Tillandsia juerg-rutschmannii is a species of flowering plant in the genus Tillandsia. This species is endemic to Mexico.

References

juerg-rutschmannii
Flora of Mexico